Matthew Butler-Hart is an English film director, writer and actor. He is best known for his work on the films, The Isle and Infinitum: Subject Unknown.

Career 
Matthew is the co-founder, along with his wife, Tori Butler-Hart, of the Fizz and Ginger Films.

Filmography

As actor

 2021 – Infinitum: Subject Unknown
 2018 – Transference
 2017 – Suicide Feast
 2015 – Drunk on Love
 2015 – Two Down
 2014 – Miss in Her Teens
 2012 – The Humpersnatch Case
 2011 – Blog Off
 2011 – Claude et Claudette
 2010 – E'gad, Zombies!
 2010 – The Symmetry of Love
 2009 – A Cambridge Tale
 2009 – Wicked Wood

 2008 – Ghoul Skool: Haunted Sussex
 2008 – Spring Heeled Jack
 2008 – Love Me Still
 2007 – Holby City
 2006 – Bikini-Blitzkrieg, Part One: Dance Domination
 2006 – Bad Girls
 2006 – Wicked Good with Gavin Barnard
 2006 – The Da Vinci Code
 2003 – Dambusters
 1998 – Ultraviolet

Publications 
 2021 - Full to the Brim with Fizz, Ginger, and Fierce Determination

Awards and nominations

References

External links 

 

Living people
English film directors
English screenwriters
English male film actors
English male television actors
Year of birth missing (living people)